Bonanza is a studio album by Jamaican reggae singer Michael Rose, released in 1999 via Heartbeat Records.

Critical reception
Dave Thompson, in Reggae & Caribbean Music, called Bonanza "Rose's most diverse album to date, and his hardest hitting." AllMusic called it "a fabulous album for any mood or occasion." CMJ New Music Report wrote that Rose "presents his classic take on modern reggae, incorporating hints of American R&B and hardcore dancehall into his straight-ahead reggae style."

Track listing
"Ganja Bonanza"
"Someone Is Watching"
"Youths Of The Ghetto"
"It's Alright"
"Whoo-La"
"Give A Little"
"Chatto"
"Jah Jah Never Fail I"
"We All Need Love"
"Rock With Somebody" 
"Christian Soldiers"
"Revolution" 
"Brown Eyes" 
"Bogus Badge"

References

1999 albums
Michael Rose (singer) albums